Kenocoelus is a genus of rove beetles (the family Staphylinidae) containing a number of species, all endemic to New Zealand. It is part of the Trichonychini tribe, in the Pselaphinae subfamily of Staphylinidae.

Description 
These are small beetles (body size 1.46–1.76mm) with short antennae and small, ovoid eyes. They can be distinguished from similar genera of Trichonychini from their small size, short first antennal segment and pronotum without sulci.

Ant associations 
Some species of Kenocoelus have been repeatedly collected within Huberia ant nests suggesting that the beetles are inquilines although interactions between the species have not been directly observed.

Species 
 Kenocoelus dimorphus Broun, 1911
 Kenocoelus johni Nomura & Leschen, 2015
 Kenocoelus mikonuiensis Nomura & Leschen, 2015

References 

Beetles of New Zealand
Endemic fauna of New Zealand
Pselaphinae genera
Endemic insects of New Zealand